Surappagudem is a village in Eluru district in the state of Andhra Pradesh in India.

Demographics

 India census, Surappagudem has a population of 3217 of which 1645 are males while 1572 are females. Average Sex Ratio is 956. Child population is 319 which makes up 9.92% of total population of village with sex ratio 876. In 2011, literacy rate of the village was 79.50% when compared to 67.02% of Andhra Pradesh.

See also 
 Eluru district

References 

Villages in Eluru district